Sherry White is a Canadian film and television actress, writer and filmmaker, best known for her work as a producer and writer for the television series MVP, Rookie Blue and Saving Hope and as director of the feature film Crackie. She won the Canadian Screen Award for Best Original Screenplay, at the 6th Canadian Screen Awards in 2018, for the film Maudie.

Originally from Stephenville, Newfoundland and Labrador, she attended Memorial University of Newfoundland's Grenfell College campus in Corner Brook, where she was a classmate of Susan Kent, Adriana Maggs and Jonny Harris.

Filmography

As writer
The Bread Maker (2003)
Rabbittown (2006)
Hatching, Matching and Dispatching (2005, three episodes)
Life with Derek (2006, one episode)
MVP (2008, four episodes)
Down to the Dirt (2008)
Sophie (2009, one episode)
Crackie (2009)
18 to Life (2009, one episode)
Rookie Blue (2010, nine episodes)
Saving Hope (2012, three episodes)
Relative Happiness (2014)
Orphan Black (2015, one episode)
Maudie (2016)

As producer
Rabbittown (2006)
Crackie (2009)
Rookie Blue (2010)
Saving Hope (2012)
Orphan Black (2015)
Pretty Hard Cases (2021)

As director
Diamonds in a Bucket (2007)
Spoiled (2008)
Crackie (2009)
Imaginary Heroine (2012)
Burden of Truth (2020) - episode #23: "Crisis of Faith"

As actress
Misery Harbour (1999)
Violet (2000)
Lexx (1999, two episodes)
The Bread Maker (2003)
Hatching, Matching and Dispatching (2005, six episodes)
Rabbittown (2006)
Young Triffie (2006)
ReGenesis (2006, one episode)
MVP (2008, five episodes)
Down to the Dirt (2008)
Grown Up Movie Star (2009)
Republic of Doyle (2010, one episode)
Nurses (2020, episode #7: "Lifeboat")

References

External links

Canadian television writers
Canadian film actresses
Canadian television actresses
Canadian women screenwriters
Film producers from Newfoundland and Labrador
Canadian television producers
Canadian women television producers
Canadian women film directors
Actresses from Newfoundland and Labrador
Writers from Newfoundland and Labrador
People from Stephenville, Newfoundland and Labrador
Living people
Memorial University of Newfoundland alumni
Canadian women film producers
Year of birth missing (living people)
Best Screenplay Genie and Canadian Screen Award winners
Canadian Film Centre alumni
Canadian women television writers
21st-century Canadian screenwriters
21st-century Canadian women writers